Italia Trasporto Aereo S.p.A., trading as ITA Airways, is the state-owned flag carrier airline of Italy. It is fully owned by the Government of Italy via the Ministry of Economy and Finance. The airline flies to over 60 scheduled domestic, European, and intercontinental destinations. ITA Airways is a member of the SkyTeam airline alliance with its hub in Rome-Fiumicino and Milan-Linate as its focus city.

History

Background

Italy's flag carrier Alitalia had been in operations since 1946. It was owned by the Italian government until 2009, when it became a private company after reorganizing and merging with the bankrupt Italian airline Air One. Alitalia reorganized again in 2015 after receiving an investment from Etihad Airways, with Air France-KLM Group already owning a minority stake. With multiple failed attempts to make the airline profitable, the airline was placed under extraordinary administration in 2017 just days after Etihad Airways ended its support of Alitalia. On 17 May 2017, after the government ruled out nationalizing the airline, it was officially put on the auction block.

After multiple failed negotiations with Delta Air Lines, EasyJet, Italian railway company Ferrovie dello Stato Italiane, and China Eastern Airlines, the Italian government took ownership of the airline in March 2020. The government takeover was due in part to the belief the airline would not be able to survive the impact of the COVID-19 pandemic on its own. On 10 October 2020, the Italian government signed a decree to allow the airline to reorganize as Italia Trasporto Aereo S.p.A.

2020s
On 28 October 2020, it was reported that ITA was expected to buy several assets from Alitalia – Società Aerea Italiana S.p.A., including the brand and the flight codes of Alitalia and Alitalia CityLiner, the IATA ticketing code (055), the MilleMiglia frequent-flyer program, and airport slots at London Heathrow (68 weekly slots in summer and 65 in winter). The transaction was expected to cost €220 million.

However, on 8 January 2021, the European Commission sent a letter to the Italian Permanent Representative to the European Union calling for Italy to launch an "open, transparent, non-discriminatory and unconditional tender" to shed Alitalia assets. The letter consisted of 62 requests for clarification, rejecting the idea that the old carrier could sell its assets to the new company with no open bidding. The letter stated that ITA should not retain the Alitalia brand, since the brand is an emblematic indicator of continuity. The European Commission suggested that the combined aviation, ground handling, and maintenance businesses should be sold separately to a third party. It also suggested that slots must be sold, and that the MilleMiglia program in its entirety could not be transferred to the new corporate entity.

On 26 August 2021, ITA officially opened ticket sales on its newly launched website.

On 27 August 2021, ITA applied for an Exemption and a Foreign Air Carrier Permit with the United States Department of Transportation. The document noted the airline's intention to start flying to New York-JFK, Boston and Miami in 2021, Los Angeles and Washington-Dulles in 2022, and Chicago-O'Hare and San Francisco in 2023. The same document stated that prior to the start of its flight operations, planned for 15 October 2021, ITA would acquire certain assets from Alitalia – Società Aerea Italiana S.p.A., and that ITA would also participate in a public tender to acquire the "Alitalia" brand.

On 30 September 2021, ITA announced that it would work with Airbus as a "strategic partner", providing details of its fleet plans. The airline announced a Memorandum of Understanding with Airbus for the purchase of 10 Airbus A330neo, 7 Airbus A220 and 11 Airbus A320neo aircraft, for a total of 28, along with an agreement with Air Lease Corporation to lease an additional 31 new Airbus aircraft, including the Airbus A350-900.

On 22 October 2021, former Alitalia employees who had not been rehired protested against ITA. Women at the demonstration shouted slogans wearing only white nightgowns. Company CEO Alfredo Altavilla called the protest "a national shame".

ITA officially joined the SkyTeam alliance on 29 October 2021, but for the time being only for one year, until new owners have been found and a long-term strategy has been made.

Starting on 2 December 2021, ITA started carrying flights with the Pope starting with Pope Francis, replacing Alitalia for most outbound papal flights. The Pope's flight is often nicknamed "Shepherd One" by the press, while the actual callsign is "Volo Papale" (papal flight, in Italian) followed by a serial number.

On 24 January 2022, ITA announced that MSC Group and Lufthansa had expressed an interest in becoming majority owners of the Italian airline, with the Italian Government keeping a minority stake. On 10 March 2022, fellow SkyTeam members Delta Air Lines and the Air France–KLM group also expressed interest in investing in ITA, by teaming up with investment firm Certares. Indigo Partners also expressed interest, leaving a total of three interested parties. After the deadline ended on 23 May 2022, only MSC/Lufthansa and Air France-KLM/Certares bid for ITA. As of 31 August 2022, the Italian government has stated their preference for the Air France-KLM/Certares bid, initiating exclusive talks with the group. On 19 January 2023 Luftansa submitted a bid to the Italian Government to begin acquiring a minority share in the airline, with the intention of purchasing the remaining shares over an extended period of time and having the airline join the larger Lufthansa Group. On 27 January 2023 the Italian government and Lufthansa signed a letter of intent over the sale of a minority stake, paving the way for exclusive negotiations with the German carrier. 

In its first year of operation, the airline carried 9 million passengers.

Corporate affairs

Ownership and corporate office
ITA is fully owned by the Italian government via the Ministry of Economy and Finance. As such, the airline's corporate offices are located in the ministry.

The airline's Chief executive officer is Fabio Lazzerini.

Logo and livery

On 15 October 2021, the day flight operations began, ITA Airways' new brand was also presented. Its aircraft livery features a renewed design and new color scheme, with blue for the fuselage and white for the wings, and a white "ITA Airways" logo with part of the letter A in red and the Italian tricolor at the end of the tail. The “Alitalia” brand, though not currently used, was purchased for potential future marketing operations and to prevent its use by competitors.

Destinations

As of March 2023, ITA Airways serves 64 destinations, in Italy, Europe, North Africa, Asia, North and South America.

ITA plans to serve 74 destinations and 89 routes by 2025.

Alliances
ITA Airways has been a member of SkyTeam alliance since 29 October 2021.

Codeshare agreements
ITA Airways codeshares with the following airlines:

 Aerolineas Argentinas
 Aeroméxico
 airBaltic
 Air Corsica
 Air Europa
 Air France
 Air Malta
 Air Serbia
 Avianca
 Azul Brazilian Airlines
 Bulgaria Air
 China Airlines
 China Southern Airlines
 Croatia Airlines
 Czech Airlines
 Delta Air Lines
 Ethiopian Airlines
 Etihad Airways
 Garuda Indonesia
 Kenya Airways
 KLM
 Kuwait Airways
 Luxair
 Middle East Airlines
 Pegasus Airlines
 Royal Air Maroc
 Royal Jordanian
 Saudia
 TAP Air Portugal
 TAROM
 Vietnam Airlines
 XiamenAir

Interline agreements 
ITA Airways have Interline agreements with the following airlines:

 Austrian Airlines
 Lufthansa
 Neos
 Qantas
 Swiss International Air Lines
 Trenitalia (railway)
 Virgin Atlantic
 Vistara

Fleet

Current fleet
, ITA Airways operates an all-Airbus fleet, most of which inherited from Alitalia Fleet.

Fleet development

Announced on 30 September 2021, ITA Airways signed an agreement with Airbus with an order for 10 Airbus A330neo, 11 Airbus A320neo and 7 Airbus A220. ITA Airways also announced an agreement with Air Lease Corporation and other aircraft leasing companies to take up 56 aircraft, including the Airbus A220, Airbus A320neo, Airbus A321neo, Airbus A321LR, Airbus A330neo, and Airbus A350. The company proposed the Airbus A321LR for long-haul destinations in the Middle East (like Kuwait City, Riyadh, Jeddah) and Central Africa (like Dakar, Addis Ababa). In addition, the new long-haul fleet will enforce the company to reach new future routes in both South and North America like Atlanta International Airport, DFW Airport, Philadelphia International Airport, Chicago O'Hare, Detroit International Airport and Seattle-Tacoma International Airport after the upcoming San Francisco, Washington DC and Rio de Janeiro strengthening Rome Fiumicino and Milan Malpensa hubs.

On 15 October 2021, ITA Airways took over 18 A319-100, 25 A320-200, and 6 A330-200 from Alitalia. This is occurred in the wake of Alitalia’s shutdown on 14 October 2021, before the commencement of ITA Airways’s operations on 15 October 2021. These aircraft joining the fleet were in addition to the 2 A320-200 and the 1 A330-200 already under the ITA Airways AOC. This addition of these 49 aircraft brought ITA Airways’s fleet total to 52 aircraft, the planned number for the start of operations.

Accidents and incidents
 On 17 June 2022, an ITA Airways Airbus A330-200, registration EI-EJL, struck an Air France Boeing 777-200ER, registered F-GSPQ at New York City's John F. Kennedy International Airport. The pilots of the Air France 777 informed Air traffic control and advised them not to let the ITA A330 takeoff. The ITA Airways flight was still cleared for take-off and continued its flight to Rome, Italy, where wing damage was discovered after landing at the destination by inspectors. The incident is currently under investigation.

Services

Frequent flyer program
Volare is the airline's loyalty program, through which customers accrue points based on miles flown. The European Commission prohibited the airline from buying Alitalia's MilleMiglia loyalty program.

See also
Alitalia
List of airlines of Italy

References

External links

Official website

Airlines established in 2020
Airlines of Italy
Italian companies established in 2020
Government-owned airlines
Italian brands
Companies based in Rome
SkyTeam
Italia Trasporto Aereo